Katedralskolan (Swedish; "the Cathedral School") is the name, or part of the name, of several Swedish language schools in Sweden and Finland, each of which traces its origin to a medieval cathedral school or a 17th-century gymnasium near a cathedral:

Katedralskolan, Linköping, Sweden
Katedralskolan, Lund, Sweden
Katedralskolan, Skara, Sweden
Katedralskolan, Uppsala, Sweden
Katedralskolan, Växjö, Sweden
Katedralskolan, Åbo, Finland